Bennetts Corner is a populated place in Solebury Township, Bucks County, Pennsylvania at the intersection of Edison Furlong Road and Pebble Hill Road about  southeast of Doylestown.

History
Bennetts Corner was named from the Bennett family who owned land in the area prior to 1870, and has been known by this name since the mid-1800s.

Geography and statistics
An unnamed tributary of the Neshaminy Creek, part of the Delaware River watershed runs through the village. It is located in the Doylestown (18901) Zip code, and the telephone Area codes 215, 267, and 445.

References

Unincorporated communities in Bucks County, Pennsylvania